Cosmosoma hercyna is a moth of the family Erebidae. It was described by Herbert Druce in 1884. It is found in Mexico and Nicaragua.

References

hercyna
Moths described in 1884